I Can See Your Voice Indonesia is an Indonesian television mystery music game show series based on the South Korean programme of the same name. It features a group of "mystery singers", with the objective of guest artist(s) are to eliminate potential bad singers, assisted by clues and celebrity panelists; and the game ends with a duet between the last remaining mystery singer and one of the guest artist(s).

Overall, the series has played 74 guest artists that aired five seasons and 79 episodes on MNCTV (from its debut on 29 August 2016 to 12 April 2021). 

The Indonesian counterpart also aired the first episodes with an entire lineup of kids as mystery singers, as well as the first under battle format applied on ICSYV counterpart, which was initially used by spin-off programme Giọng ải giọng ai.

Series overview

Episodes

Season 1 (2016)

Season 2 (2017)

Season 3 (2018)

Season 4 (2018—19)

Season 5 (2021)

Specials

Notes

References

I Can See Your Voice Indonesia
Lists of Indonesian television series episodes